Sylvester Owens was an American Negro league outfielder in the 1930s and 1940s.

Owens made his Negro leagues debut in 1937 with the Birmingham Black Barons. He went on to play with several teams, including the St. Louis–New Orleans Stars and Philadelphia Stars, and finished his career in 1942 with the Jacksonville Red Caps.

References

External links
 and Seamheads

Year of birth missing
Year of death missing
Place of birth missing
Place of death missing
Birmingham Black Barons players
Jacksonville Red Caps players
St. Louis–New Orleans Stars players
Philadelphia Stars players
Baseball outfielders